"2 Heads" is a 2015 country song by Canadian singer Coleman Hell and his debut single. It was included on his self-titled EP, released on October 23, 2015. It was a commercial success in both Canada and the United States.

Charts

Weekly charts

Year-end charts

Certifications

References

2015 songs
2015 debut singles
Coleman Hell songs
Columbia Records singles